Arnold Escher von der Linth (8 June 1807 in Zürich12 July 1872) was a Swiss geologist, the son of Hans Conrad Escher von der Linth (1767–1823).

He made the first ascent of the Lauteraarhorn on 8 August 1842 together with Pierre Jean Édouard Desor and Christian Girard, and guides Melchior Bannholzer and Jakob Leuthold.

He studied geology and other sciences in Geneva, where one of his teachers was Nicolas Theodore de Saussure, and in Berlin as a student of Leopold von Buch and Alexander von Humboldt. In 1856 he became professor of geology at the École Polytechnique in Zürich and established the Geological Institute there. His researches led him to be regarded as one of the founders of Swiss geology.

With Bernhard Studer, he was the first to systematically explore the geology of the Swiss Alps and its neighboring regions (eastern Switzerland, Vorarlberg, Tyrol, Piedmont and Lombardy). Also with Studer, he produced a highly acclaimed geological map of Switzerland (1853).

In particular, his scientific liaison with the Scottish geologist Roderick Murchison (1792–1871) made him a contributor to the discovery of the Silurian system, and the first systematic description of sedimentary rocks and their index fossils.

He was the author of Geologische Bemerkungen über das nordliche Vorarlberg und einige angrenzenden Gegenden (Geological observations on the northern Vorarlberg and some adjacent areas), published at Zürich in 1853.

References

1807 births
1872 deaths
19th-century Swiss geologists
Academic staff of ETH Zurich
Swiss mountain climbers
Scientists from Zürich
Escher von der Linth